Metea Valley High School is a high school in Aurora, Illinois that opened in August 2009 in DuPage County. The school is one of four high schools operated by the Indian Prairie School District. Waubonsie Valley High School is also in Aurora, while Neuqua Valley High School and Wheatland Academy are in Naperville. The school follows IPSD's tradition of naming its High Schools after Native American figures with its namesake Metea.

Preparations
Serving Indian Prairie School District 204, and opened for the 2009–2010 academic year for freshman and sophomore classes (grades nine and ten), Metea Valley cost $124.7 million to build, and can hold 3,000 students. The school met its full enrollment of students for grades 9-12 during the 2011–2012 academic year. The school began its first Prairie State Achievement Exams (used as a standardized testing measure of academic achievement) during the 2010–2011 academic year, and per Illinois High School Association Policy, the school was not fully recognized for interscholastic sports until that same academic year.

The school's namesake, a chief of the Potawatomi tribe, was selected during 2006. The school's colors are black and gold (maintaining a tradition of '<color> and gold' in all three high schools) and the school's mascot is the 'Mustangs'. The colors were announced in February 2007, and the mascot selection in March 2007. Both were chosen by those middle school students who began attending the school in 2009, as well as the current Neuqua and Waubonsie students in 2007. The School joined the Upstate Eight Conference in the 2010-2011 school year.

Demographics
In 2020, 39.3% of the student body identified as White, 29.3% of the student body identified as Asian, 13.7% of the student body identified as Black, 13.3% of the student body identified as Hispanic, and 4.4% of the student body identified as another race.

Academics

Metea Valley High School's first principal was Jim Schmid, former principal of Waubonsie Valley High School. On January 8, 2014, Principal Schmid announced that Dr. Darrell Echols, Principal at Hill Middle School at the time, had been named the new Metea Valley High School Principal. Echols assumed his position July 1, 2014 following Mr. Schmid's retirement.

During the 2013-2014 school year, Metea Valley was ranked as the 669th best high school in America and the 29th best in Illinois according to U.S. News & World Report. Metea Valley was also ranked the 23rd most challenging high school in Illinois. This ranking is based on standardized test scores and percentage of students on subsidized lunch, among other factors.

Construction
One of the companies contracted for the school's construction was Commercial Mechanical Inc (CMI) from Dunlap, Illinois. The school was designed by the Chicago office of DLR Group. The construction manager was Turner Construction Company.

Construction began on May 7, 2008. It began with an extensive earth moving operation. For months, as the landscape changed, there was no discernible structure, although one could see the flattened "footprint" where the building would be located and massive sewer pipes and basins dotting the land. Then, early in August 2008, steel structural beams started to rise up near the southwest corner of the property.

The musical hallway opened on January 4, 2010. The auditorium was completed in early February 2010.

The campus was ranked #20 in the "Most Amazing High School Campuses in the Nation" in 2014.

Activities

The school sponsors numerous extracurricular clubs and organizations ranging from arts and academic to cultural and special interest. Listed here are the most notable in terms of being chapters of a larger national movement. An entire list can be found here.

 Asian American Club (AAC)
 Best Buddies
 Business Professionals of America (BPA)
 Family, Career & Community Leaders of America (FCCLA)
 Future Educators Association (FEA)
 Future Medical Professionals Club
 Gay/Straight Alliance (GSA)
 German Club
 Junior State of America (JSA)
 Key Club
 Math Team
 Model United Nations (Model UN, MUN)
 National Art Honor Society (NAHS)
 National Social Studies Honor Society (Rho Kappa) 
 Operation Snowball
 Science Olympiad
 Scholastic Bowl
 Speech
 Special Olympics
 Vocational Industrial Clubs of America/Skills USA (VICA)
 Tri-M
 VEX Robotics
 YMCA Youth and Government
 Stem Counsel

Athletics
From the fall of 2009 through the spring of 2015, the athletic teams participated in the Upstate Eight Conference.  In the fall of 2015, Metea Valley athletes began participating in the DuPage Valley Conference.

The athletic teams from Metea Valley High School are supported by the Athletic Boosters Club which provides financial support to the athletic program by providing concussion screening for athletes, school wide heart screening, and continual improvement of the athletic facilities.

2012 Lacrosse Combined State Champion - In 2012, Metea Valley students participated on a combined lacrosse team with Waubonsie Valley and won the IHSLA B-division State Championship against Grayslake North High School.
2014 Hockey Combined State Champion - In 2014, Metea Valley students participated on a combined hockey team with Waubonsie Valley students and won the Combined State Championship.
2014 Rugby Combined State Champion - In 2014, Metea Valley students participated on a combined Rugby team with Waubonsie Valley students and won the State Championship.
- In 2021, girls volleyball won the IHSA 4a State Championship.  They only had 2 losses on the season.

Music
In 2016, Metea Valley was presented with one of three GRAMMY Signature Gold Schools award. GRAMMY Signature School awards are given to high school music programs that are keeping music programs alive and well despite budgets and school politics.

The music department at Metea Valley hosts an annual concert in December named "Collage". The event comprises four repetitions of the same concert spread over two nights; however, soloists and small ensembles who play during transitions often differ between the concerts. Each concert ends with a finale featuring all music students from Metea Valley. In 2013, the Collage concerts featured a group of tuba and euphonium players going under the name "The Deep Brass Ensemble", that played Frosty the Snowman on sousaphones and euphoniums.

The Metea Valley Marching Mustangs is the school's marching band. They perform during halftime at all of the Metea Valley home football games. Their halftime show changes every year and have general themes such as "Disney Tribute", "BeatleMania" and "Stars and Stripes". Every year the band goes on a trip to another state to show off what they've worked so hard to achieve. These places range in distance from Ohio, to Florida, and even as far as Hawaii. They also participate in band days at places such as University of Wisconsin, University of Illinois, and Northern Illinois University. On November 11, 2014, the Marching Mustangs held a "Tribute to Veterans" concert along with some other groups from the music department.

The Marching Mustangs were one of many bands selected to perform at the 2013 Outback Bowl in Tampa Bay, Florida, and would be invited again in 2019. The band also traveled to Hawaii over the 2014 Thanksgiving week to perform at the Waikiki Holiday Parade and at Pearl Harbor. The band played their show "Stars and Stripes" at this venue. In 2020, It was planned for the Marching Mustangs to go to Cleveland, Ohio, where they would play their rock themed show at the Rock and Roll Hall of Fame and participate in a parade at Cedar Point. This, however, like many events in 2020, was cancelled, but the show was still produced under strict regulations as to mitigate the spread of Covid-19. This year saw the number of participants drop sharply, but it didn't stop them from playing halftime shows and coming back even stronger the next year in the 2021 season.

Additionally, they participate in an annual Memorial and Labor Day parade in either Naperville or Aurora, the two closest cities.

Metea Valley students also participate in the Annual Fine Arts Festival, since its opening in 2009.

References

Public high schools in Illinois
Education in Aurora, Illinois
Schools in DuPage County, Illinois